Juliette Faber (1919–2008) was a Luxembourg-born French stage and film actress.

Selected filmography
 Happy Days (1941)
 The Strangers in the House (1942)
 Shop Girls of Paris (1943)
 The Temptation of Barbizon (1946)
 Justice Is Done (1950)
 Monsieur Octave (1951)
 The Convict (1951)
 The Case of Doctor Galloy (1951)
 We Are All Murderers (1952)

References

Bibliography
 Goble, Alan. The Complete Index to Literary Sources in Film. Walter de Gruyter, 1999.

External links

1919 births
2008 deaths
French film actresses
French stage actresses
People from Grevenmacher
Luxembourgian film actresses
20th-century French women
Luxembourgian emigrants to France